Results from the Football in Norway in 1904.

Cup

Semifinal

|colspan="3" style="background-color:#97DEFF"|3 September 1904

Final

See also
List of football clubs in Norway
Norwegian Football Cup seasons

References

External links
RSSSF Football Archive

 
Seasons in Norwegian football